Sergei Dotsenko was a Soviet-Uzbekistani footballer and coach who also played and coached several Ukrainian clubs.

External links
 Brief biography at rusteam.permian.ru
 Clubs' statistics at football.odessa.ua

1947 births
2006 deaths
Sportspeople from Karaganda
Kazakhstani people of Ukrainian descent
Kazakhstani emigrants to Uzbekistan
Soviet footballers
Soviet football managers
Uzbekistani footballers
Uzbekistani football managers
Uzbekistani expatriate football managers
Expatriate football managers in Ukraine
Uzbekistani expatriate sportspeople in Ukraine
FC Dustlik players
Pakhtakor Tashkent FK players
FC Dynamo Kyiv players
FC Chornomorets Odesa players
Olympic footballers of the Soviet Union
Xorazm FK Urganch managers
Navbahor Namangan managers
Sogdiana Jizzakh managers
FC Vorskla Poltava managers
FC Temp Shepetivka managers
FC Metalist Kharkiv managers
FC Ahrotekhservis Sumy managers
Ukrainian Premier League managers
Soviet Top League players
FK Dinamo Samarqand managers
Traktor Tashkent managers
FC Shurtan Guzar managers
Uzbekistan Super League managers
Association football defenders